Holton St Mary is a village and civil parish in Suffolk, England. Located on the B1070 around five miles south-west of Ipswich and half a mile from the A12 (which forms the parish's south-east boundary), it is part of Babergh district.

The western end of the parish is part of the Dedham Vale Area of Outstanding Natural Beauty and the Higham meadow nature reserve.

It was the birthplace of the 13 times British flat racing Champion Jockey, Nat Flatman.

References

External links
St Mary's church Suffolk Churches

External links

Villages in Suffolk
Babergh District
Civil parishes in Suffolk